Ćukovine is a village in Serbia. It is situated in the Koceljeva municipality, in the Mačva District of Central Serbia. The village had a Serb ethnic majority and a population of 375 in 2002.

Historical population

1948: 833
1953: 888
1961: 822
1971: 752
1981: 591
1991: 441
2002: 375

References

See also
List of places in Serbia

Populated places in Mačva District